"All of My Heart" is a song by English new wave and synth-pop band ABC, from their debut studio album, The Lexicon of Love (1982). It was released as a single in the UK on 27 August 1982 and peaked at No. 5 on the UK Singles Chart. The B-side, "Overture", was an instrumental, orchestral medley of songs from The Lexicon of Love, arranged by Anne Dudley.

Critical reception
In a retrospective review of the song, AllMusic critic Mike DeGagne wrote: "The lushness of the instruments and the small amounts of musical detail drape the body of the track, adding a slight classical feel to the song's flow."

In 2005, Jess Harvell of Pitchfork listed "All of My Heart" as his favorite UK song of the post-punk "new pop" era, describing it as "ABC's slickest and most gorgeous single, and yet also possibly their most bitter." Harvell wrote: "Martin Fry alternates between open hearted and suspicious, warm and resentful with the turn of a phrase. The outro–a swirl of soundtrack strings, plucked bass, and cascading piano–is the most purely beautiful music of the era."

Track listing
 "All of My Heart" – 4:45
 "Overture" – 3:56

Chart performance

References

External links
 

1982 singles
ABC (band) songs
Songs written by Martin Fry
Songs written by Stephen Singleton
Songs written by Mark White (musician)
Song recordings produced by Trevor Horn
1982 songs